Anisimovka is the name of several rural localities in Russia:
Anisimovka, Novosibirsk Oblast, a selo in Karasuksky District of Novosibirsk Oblast
Anisimovka, Primorsky Krai, a selo in Shkotovsky District of Primorsky Krai
Anisimovka, Rostov Oblast, a khutor in Verkhnemakeyevskoye Rural Settlement of Kasharsky District of Rostov Oblast
Anisimovka, Tyumen Oblast, a village in Pamyatninsky Rural Okrug of Yalutorovsky District of Tyumen Oblast
Anisimovka, Vologda Oblast, a village in Ilyinsky Selsoviet of Cherepovetsky District of Vologda Oblast